South Side High School in Jackson, Tennessee is a public high school, part of the Jackson-Madison County School System school system. It was created in 1956 by the consolidation of Pinson High School, Malesus High School, J.B. Young High School and Mercer High School. In 1992 they absorbed the students of West High School (Jackson, Tennessee) when it was abolished as part of the merger of the Jackson and Madison County school systems.

Notable people
Alumni
Jabari Greer, former professional football player
Wil Masoud, professional football player
Faculty
Joe McKnight, Tennessee state senator

References 

Educational institutions established in 1956
Schools in Madison County, Tennessee
Public high schools in Tennessee
1956 establishments in Tennessee